Camuropiscidae is a family of mostly small, bullet or spindle-shaped extinct arthrodire placoderms from the Late Devonian.  With the exception of the snub-nosed Simosteus, camuropiscid placoderms are characterized by an elongated, tubular snout. The entire family is restricted to the Frasnian Gogo Reef Formation of Australia.

The camuropiscids' elongated snouts, streamlined body shape, and rapid jaw closure are thought as adaptations for pelagic, pursuit predators, swallowing their prey whole.

Phylogeny
Camuropiscidae is a member of the superfamily Incisoscutoidea, which belongs to the clade Coccosteomorphi, one of the two major clades within Eubrachythoraci. The cladogram below shows the phylogeny of Camuropiscidae:

References

 
Placoderm families
Middle Devonian first appearances
Late Devonian animals
Late Devonian extinctions